Sir John Trevor (1626 – 28 May 1672) was a Welsh  politician who sat in the House of Commons at various times between 1646 and 1672.

Biography
Trevor was a son of Sir John Trevor (d. 1673) of Trevalyn Hall, Denbighshire.  His father was a member of parliament under James I and Charles I, and sat also in the parliaments of Oliver and of Richard Cromwell, and was a member of the council of state during the Commonwealth.

In 1646, Trevor was elected Member of Parliament for Flintshire in the Long Parliament and sat until the Barebones Parliament of 1653. Thereafter he was re-elected MP for Flintshire in 1654 for the First Protectorate Parliament, in 1656 for the Second Protectorate Parliament and in 1659 for the Third Protectorate Parliament.

After filling several public positions under the Commonwealth and Protectorate he was a member of the council of state appointed in February 1660 and under Charles II, he rose to a high position. Having purchased the office of secretary of state he was knighted and entered upon its duties towards the end of 1668, just after he had helped to arrange an important treaty between England and France.

Trevor predeceased his father by a year, dying on 28 May 1672.

Family
Trevor married Ruth Hampden, daughter of John Hampden and had a son Thomas who was created Baron Trevor in 1712. One of Trevor's uncles was Sir Sackville Trevor (d. 1633), a naval officer, who was knighted in 1604; and another was Sir Thomas Trevor (1586–1656), one of the judges who decided in favour of the Crown in the famous case about the legality of ship money, and was afterwards impeached and fined.

Notes

References

 

1626 births
1672 deaths
Members of the Parliament of England (pre-1707) for constituencies in Wales
Secretaries of State for the Northern Department
English MPs 1640–1648
English MPs 1648–1653
English MPs 1653 (Barebones)
English MPs 1654–1655
English MPs 1656–1658
English MPs 1659
English MPs 1660
English MPs 1661–1679